New York's 71st State Assembly district is one of the 150 districts in the New York State Assembly.

Geography 
District 71 is located in Manhattan, comprising portions of Hamilton Heights, Harlem, and Washington Heights.

Recent election results

2022

2020

2018

2017 special

2016

2014

2012

References 

71